is a railway station on the Kintetsu Utsube Line in Yokkaichi, Mie Prefecture, Japan, operated by the private railway operator Kintetsu. It is 2.5 rail kilometers from the terminus of the line at Kintetsu-Yokkaichi Station.

Lines
Kintetsu
Utsube Line

Layout
Minami-Hinaga Station has a single side platform serving bi-directional traffic. The station is unattended.

Platforms

Adjacent stations

Surrounding area
Yokkaichi Technical High School
Kayo department store

History
Minami-Hinaga Station was opened on June 21, 1922, as a station on the Mie Railway. On February 11, 1944, due to mergers, the station came under the ownership of Sanco. On February 1, 1964, the Railway division of Sanco split off and formed a separate company, the Mie Electric Railway, which merged with Kintetsu on April 1, 1965.

References

External links
 Kintetsu: Minami-Hinaga Station

Railway stations in Japan opened in 1922
Railway stations in Mie Prefecture